Mićin  is a Serbo-Croatian surname. Notable people with the surname include:

Petar Mićin (born 1998), Serbian footballer
Žarko Mićin (born 1982), Serbian lawyer and politician

Serbian surnames
Slavic-language surnames
Patronymic surnames